Moambe chicken ( or simply) is a savory chicken dish popular in Central Africa and considered the national dish of Angola. The dish itself is made by combining chicken, spices and palm butter to create a stew-like consistency. A number of local or regional variations exist across the Congo and Central Africa; the dish is also known outside the continent.

Preparation
Poulet moambe (French for "chicken in palm butter sauce") is prepared by cooking chicken in moambe (palm butter) and spinach, then seasoned with spices like peri-peri or red pepper. It is typically served with sweet potatoes, brown onions, hard-boiled eggs and a sauce made from crushed palm nuts. Moambe chicken can also be accompanied by rice or manioc (cassava) paste. The chicken can be substituted with duck or fish.

Popularity
Moambe chicken is regarded as the national dish of the Democratic Republic of the Congo. It is a common household dish in Belgium. Angolan moamba chicken can be found in Portugal.

References

External links
 La moambe at RTBF
 Poulet à la moambe at Cuisineaz

Chicken dishes
National dishes
Democratic Republic of the Congo cuisine
Angolan cuisine
Gabonese cuisine
Spicy foods